Christoph Meier (born 3 January 1993) is a Liechtensteiner swimmer.

He competed at the 2015 World Aquatics Championships and at the 2016 Summer Olympics in Rio de Janeiro.

At the 2016 Summer Olympics, he placed 22 in the heats of the men's 400m individual medley and did not qualify for the semifinals. He was the flag bearer for Liechtenstein during the closing ceremony.

In 2019, he competed in swimming at the 2019 Games of the Small States of Europe held in Budva, Montenegro.

References

External links
 

1993 births
Living people
Liechtenstein male swimmers
Olympic swimmers of Liechtenstein
Swimmers at the 2016 Summer Olympics
Male butterfly swimmers
Liechtenstein male freestyle swimmers
Male medley swimmers
Male breaststroke swimmers
Swimmers at the 2020 Summer Olympics